Narin Afrin (b.  1974) is the nom de guerre of Meysa Abdo, a leader of the Kurdish People's Protection Units (YPG), Women's Protection Units (YPJ), and Kobane resistance, notably during the 2014–2015 Siege of Kobanî.

Background 

Narin Afrin was a resistance leader during the 2014–2015 Siege of Kobanî, representing the Kurdish People's Protection Units (YPG) and Peshmerga fighters. The resistance group, the People's Protection Units (YPG), is secular, politically left, and the armaments of the Kurdish Democratic Union Party (PYD). She also leads the Women's Protection Units (YPJ), an all-female force.

Afrin is the nom de guerre of Meysa Abdo, born c. 1974, though a Kurdish political consultant has told the International Business Times that Abdo is a pseudonym as well. Female fighters choose their names during military training as a way to separate their future from their past. "Afrin" refers to her Kurdish village of Afrin, Syria, and "Narin" was a name she liked.

Afrin avoids media spotlight—most published photos of Afrin were not actually her—and has expressed worry about the media portrayal of the Women's Protection Units, which focuses on the "cause célèbre" of empowered, "bronzed women toting guns" in a conservative region associated with a ruthless Islamic State. In 2014, the Financial Times reported that Afrin had become a "local legend" among Kurds.

She had studied with Abdullah Öcalan, the founder of the Kurdistan Workers' Party (PKK). She had participated in the PKK for 20 years prior to the Siege of Kobanî. Prior to Kobanî, she had fought in Cezire (Qamishli region) before moving to Kobanî in early 2013.

References

External links 

 Who is the Peshmerga Princess, Narin Afrin, who leads troops making their stand in Kobane? - BBC World Service

Living people
People of the Syrian civil war
People's Protection Units
Kobanî
Kurdish military personnel
Kurdish female military and paramilitary personnel
Year of birth missing (living people)